Penstemon acuminatus is a species of flowering plant in the plantain family known by the common names sharpleaf penstemon and sand-dune penstemon. It is native to the northwestern United States, where it occurs in Washington, Oregon, Idaho, Utah, and Nevada.

The basal leaves are up to 10 to 15 centimeters long and those higher on the stem are up to 7. They may clasp the stem at their bases. The fleshy leaves and the stem may be waxy in texture. Arranged in whorls near the ends of the stems, the tubular blue, purple, or pink flowers are up to 2 cm long. They have wide throats and flaring corollas. The staminode has a beard of yellow hairs.

This plant grows in sandy habitat types, such as dunes.

This species is used for revegetation of wildlife habitat, for landscaping and gardens, and for seeding roadsides.

References

External links
USDA Plants Profile
NatureServe

acuminatus
Flora of the United States